The Prix du Québec are awards given by the Government of Quebec to individuals for cultural and scientific achievements. Founded in 1977, the government annually awards seven awards in the cultural field and six in the scientific field.

Cultural awards 
Prix Albert-Tessier, for cinema
Prix Athanase-David, for literature
Prix Denise-Pelletier, for acting
Prix Ernest-Cormier, for architecture and design
Prix Georges-Émile-Lapalme, for the French language
Prix Gérard-Morisset, for a career in archives, museology and popular culture
Prix Guy-Mauffette, for radio and television arts
Prix Paul-Émile-Borduas, for visual arts and applied arts

Scientific awards 
Prix Armand-Frappier, for scientific research and education
Prix Léon-Gérin, for human and social sciences
Prix Lionel-Boulet, for innovation leading to economic growth
Prix Marie-Andrée-Bertrand, for innovation in social sciences leading to collective well-being
Prix Marie-Victorin, for natural sciences
Prix Wilder-Penfield, for biology, medicine an engineering

See also
National Order of Quebec
List of Canadian awards

External links
 Les Prix du Québec 

 
Culture of Quebec
Awards established in 1977
Quebec-related lists
Quebec awards
Government of Quebec
1977 establishments in Quebec